Hal Ziegler (August 23, 1932 – November 11, 2012) was an American politician.

Born in Jackson, Michigan, Zieger was a lawyer. He also served as a Republican in the Michigan House of Representatives 1966-1974 and then in the Michigan State Senate in 1974.

Notes

1932 births
2012 deaths
Politicians from Jackson, Michigan
Michigan lawyers
Republican Party members of the Michigan House of Representatives
Republican Party Michigan state senators
20th-century American lawyers
20th-century American politicians